Tomasz Ostalczyk (born August 22, 1987 in Zgierz) is a Polish footballer who currently plays for Chojniczanka Chojnice.

Career

Club
In September 2007, he was loaned to Sandecja Nowy Sącz on a half year deal.

In February 2010, he signed a contract with Górnik Polkowice.

In July 2010, he joined Tur Turek.

In February 2011, he moved to Flota Świnoujście.

In July 2012, he joined Zawisza Bydgoszcz.

References

External links
 

Polish footballers
ŁKS Łódź players
Górnik Polkowice players
Sandecja Nowy Sącz players
Flota Świnoujście players
Zawisza Bydgoszcz players
Chojniczanka Chojnice players
1987 births
Living people
People from Zgierz
Sportspeople from Łódź Voivodeship
Association football midfielders